This article contains information about the literary events and publications of 1839.

Events
January 21 – Åbo Svenska Teater in Åbo (Turku), Finland, opens with a performance of the Swedish-language play Gubben i Bergsbygden.
March – W. Harrison Ainsworth takes over editorship of Bentley's Miscellany from Charles Dickens at the end of the year. Until April serializations of their respective novels Jack Sheppard and Oliver Twist have been running simultaneously in the magazine.
April – Washington Irving begins contributing regularly to The Knickerbocker, and will publish thirty new pieces in the magazine through March 1841 — including "The Creole Village," where he coins the phrase "the almighty dollar".
May 31 – An important British constitutional case of Stockdale v Hansard begins when publisher John Joseph Stockdale sues for libel after John Roberton's pseudo-medical work On Diseases of the Generative System (1811) is declared in a parliamentary report to be indecent.
September – The first known London production of Love's Labour's Lost after Shakespeare's era opens at the Theatre Royal, Covent Garden, with Madame Vestris as Rosaline.
unknown dates
Mikhail Lermontov publishes the first two parts of A Hero of Our Time (Герой нашего времени, Geroy nashevo vremeni) in Otechestvennye Zapiski. The novel comes to be seen as a pioneering classic of Russian psychological realism.
Sir Gawain and the Green Knight, a late 14th-century Middle English alliterative romance by the 'Pearl Poet', is first published complete in Syr Gawayne, a collection of early romance poems by Scottish and English authors relating to that knight of the Round Table, edited by Frederic Madden for the Bannatyne Club.
George Bell establishes the London publisher George Bell & Sons as an educational bookseller in Bouverie Street.

New books

Fiction
W. Harrison Ainsworth – Jack Sheppard
Carl Jonas Love Almqvist – Det går an (It's Acceptable, translated as Sara Videbeck and the Chapel)
Honoré de Balzac
Béatrix
Illusions perdues, II: Un Grand homme de province à Paris (Lost Illusions, II: A Distinguished Provincial in Paris)
Pierre Grassou
Nicolaas Beets (as Hildebrand) – Camera Obscura
Fredrika Bremer – Hemmet eller familje-sorger och fröjder
Sarah Burney – The Romance of Private Life: The Renunciation and The Hermitage
Charles Dickens – Nicholas Nickleby (serialization completed and in book form)
 Alexandre Dumas - Captain Pamphile
Maurits Hansen – Mordet paa Maskinbygger Roolfsen (The Murder of Engine-maker Roolfsen)
Frederick Marryat – Diary in America
Harriet Martineau – Deerbrook
Ellen Pickering
Nan Darrell, or The Gypsy Mother
The Fright
Edgar Allan Poe
The Fall of the House of Usher
William Wilson
George Sand
Pauline
Spiridion
Jules Sandeau – Marianna
Stendhal – The Charterhouse of Parma (La Chartreuse de Parme)
Philip Meadows Taylor – Confessions of a Thug
Cirilo Villaverde – Cecilia Valdés

Children and young people
Catherine Sinclair – Holiday House: A Book for the Young
Frederick Marryat – The Phantom Ship
Hans Christian Andersen – Fairy Tales Told for Children. New Collection. Second Booklet (Eventyr, fortalte for Børn. Ny Samling. Andet Hefte) comprising "The Garden of Paradise" ("Paradisets have"), "The Flying Trunk" ("Den flyvende Kuffert") and "The Storks" ("Storkene")

Drama
Edward Bulwer – Richelieu
Felicia Hemans – De Chatillon
 James Sheridan Knowles – Love
George Sand – Gabriel
Juliusz Słowacki – Balladyna

Poetry

Philip James Bailey (anonymous) – Festus
Cláudio Manuel da Costa (posthumous) – Vila Rica
Théodore Hersart de la Villemarqué (compiler) – Barzaz Breiz (Breton Ballads)
Henry Wadsworth Longfellow – Voices of the Night

Non-fiction
Louis Blanc – L'Organisation du travail
Charles Darwin – The Voyage of the Beagle
Mrs William Ellis – The Women of England: their social duties and domestic habits
Michael Faraday – Experimental Researches in Electricity
George W. M. Reynolds – Grace Darling; or, the Heroine of the Ferne Islands
Jared Sparks – Life of Washington
John Tallis – Tallis Directory

Births
January 7 – Ouida, English novelist (died 1908)
January 26 – Mary Ann Maitland, Scottish-born Canadian author (died 1919)
February 1 – James Herne, American dramatist (died 1901)
February 22 – Francis Pharcellus Church, American editor and publisher (died 1906)
March 9 – Františka Stránecká, Czech writer and collector of Moravian folklore (died 1888)
March 16 – Sully Prudhomme, French poet and essayist, winner of the first Nobel Prize in Literature (died 1907)
March 28 – Emily Lee Sherwood Ragan, American author and journalist (died 1918)
April 18 – Henry Kendall, Australian poet (died 1882)
June 21 – Joaquim Maria Machado de Assis, Brazilian poet and novelist (died 1908)
June 22 – Clara Augusta Jones Trask, American dime novelist (died 1905)
July 5 – Helen Stuart Campbell, American author, editor, and reformer (died 1918)
July 11 – Kate Sanborn, American author and essayist (died 1917)
July 21 – Emma Rood Tuttle, American author and poet (died 1916)
August 4 – Walter Pater, English writer (died 1894)
August 9 – Gaston Paris, French writer and scholar (died 1903)
August 25 – Martha E. Cram Bates, American writer, journalist, and editor (died 1905)
September 10 – Charles Sanders Peirce, American philosopher (died 1914)
November 4 – S. M. I. Henry, American author, evangelist, and reformer (died 1900)
November 16 – William De Morgan (sic), English novelist and potter (died 1917)
November 29 – Ludwig Anzengruber, Austrian dramatist (died 1889)
December 12 – Charlotte Frances Wilder, American writer (died 1916)
December 23 – Lucinda Barbour Helm, American author, editor, and activist (died 1897)

Deaths
January 16 – Edmund Lodge, English biographer and writer on heraldry (born 1756)
April 11 – John Galt, Scottish novelist and entrepreneur (born 1779)
April 13 – Robert Millhouse, English weaver poet (born 1788)
April 22 – Thomas Haynes Bayly, English poet, songwriter and dramatist (born 1797)
May 9 – Joseph Fiévée, French journalist, novelist, essayist and playwright (born 1767)
May 17 – Archibald Alison, Scottish author (born 1757)
May 21 – José María Heredia y Campuzano, Cuban poet (born 1803)
June 26 – Winifred Gales, English novelist and memoirist (born 1761)
August 3 – Dorothea von Schlegel, German novelist and translator (born 1764)
September 4 – Hermann Olshausen, German theologian (born 1796)
September 28 – William Dunlap, American dramatist (born 1766)
October 11 – Leonor de Almeida Portugal, 4th Marquise of Alorna, Portuguese noblewoman, painter, and poet (born 1750)
October 22 – Alexander Odoevsky, Russian poet (born 1802)
unknown dates
Elizabeth Dawbarn, English writer on religion and child care (year of birth not known)
Mary Pilkington, English novelist, poet and children's writer (born 1761)

Awards
Newdigate prize – John Ruskin

References

 
Years of the 19th century in literature